"Enemy" is the Brilliant Green's sixteenth single, released on December 12, 2007. It peaked at #21 on the Oricon Singles Chart.

Track listing

References

2007 singles
2007 songs
SM Entertainment singles
Songs written by Shunsaku Okuda
Songs written by Tomoko Kawase
The Brilliant Green songs